Scarlotte Deupree Kilgore (born 1980) is an American beauty and performer who held the title of Miss Alabama 2002 and was 1st runner-up to Miss America 2003.

Miss Alabama
Deupree competed at Miss Alabama as Miss Camellia and had competed in the pageant four previous times.

Her talent was a vocal performance of the song, "Holding Out for a Hero". Her personal platform was adult literacy, which she chose in high school after she discovered that 25 percent of people from Alabama read at a very low reading level. She is a graduate of Samford University. While at Samford, she was inducted into the Kappa Chapter of the Alpha Delta Pi sorority.

Life after Miss Alabama
Deupree is married to Allen Kilgore, a lawyer and corporate attorney at General Electric. They have two daughters named Virginia Price Kilgore and Jordan Lee Kilgore. She is on the board of directors for The Literacy Council and serves on the board of the Birmingham Children's Theater.

References

External links
Miss Alabama official website
Official Miss America Profile

1980 births
Living people
Miss Alabama winners
Miss America 2003 delegates
People from Sylacauga, Alabama
Samford University alumni